Ichthyophis humphreyi, or Humphrey's caecilian, is a species of caecilian found presumably in tropical Asia.  Its validity as a species, habits, habitat, and description are nebulous, as it is described from one larval specimen.

References

humphreyi
Amphibians of India
Amphibians described in 1973